Bianca Ijano Quinalha (born 3 October 1993) is a Brazilian female BMX rider, representing her nation at international competitions. She competed in the time trial event and race event at the 2015 UCI BMX World Championships.

Notes

References

External links
 
 
 
 Photo of #43 (IJANO QUINALHA Bianca) BRA at the 2016 UCI BMX Supercross World Cup
  

1993 births
Living people
BMX riders
Brazilian female cyclists
Brazilian BMX riders
Place of birth missing (living people)
21st-century Brazilian women
20th-century Brazilian women